Gaby Morlay (born Blanche Pauline Fumoleau; 8 June 1893 – 4 July 1964) was a film actress from France.

Career
Morlay began acting in the era of silent films, and became known as co-star with Max Linder in his "Max" series. She starred in a series of "Gaby" films such as Gaby en auto (1917) and more than 20 other silent films. She moved easily into talking films in the early 1930s. She played Queen Victoria in the 1939 historical film Entente cordiale.

She had an affair with the government minister Max Bonnafous (1900–75) during World War II, and as a result, she was investigated for collaboration with the Nazis after the liberation of France. Later she married Bonnafous. Morlay continued to play important roles in the 1940s and 1950s.

She was an art lover and was a friend and admirer of the Italian painter Beretta Dimario who lived in Nice.

Selected filmography

 Le chevalier de Gaby (1920)
 The Agony of the Eagles (1922)
 La mendiante de Saint-Sulpice (1924)
 Montmartre (1925)
 Jim la houlette, roi des voleurs (1926)
 Les Nouveaux Messieurs (1929)
 Ariane, jeune fille russe (1930)
 Accused, Stand Up! (1930)
 When Love Is Over (1931)
 Montmartre (1931)
 Dance Hall (1931)
 Companion Wanted (1932)
 Once Upon a Time (1933)
 The Scandal (1934)
 Jeanne (1934)
 We Are Not Children (1934)
 Samson (1936)
 The King (1936)
 Nuits de feu (1937)
 The Messenger (1937)
 Giuseppe Verdi (1938)
 Hercule (1938)
 Quadrille (1938)
 Sacred Woods (1939)
 Entente cordiale (1939)
 Behind the Facade (1939)
 Paris-New York (1940)
 They Were Twelve Women (1940)
 The Black Diamond (1941)
 The Blue Veil (1942)
 Love Around the Clock (1943)
 Mademoiselle Béatrice (1943)
 Night Shift (1944)
Farandole (1945)
The Last Metro (1945)
Her Final Role (1946) 
 The Lost Village (1947)
 Three Boys, One Girl (1948)
 Gigi (1949)
 Eve and the Serpent (1949)
 Millionaires for One Day (1949)
 Summer Storm (1949)
 Father's Dilemma (1950)
 Without Trumpet or Drum (1950)
 Anna (1951)
 Mammy (1951)
 Good Enough to Eat (1951)
 The Girl with the Whip (1952)
 Le Plaisir (1952)
 The Love of a Woman (1953)
 The Lovers of Marianne (1953)
 Royal Affairs in Versailles (1954)
 Papa, maman, la bonne et moi (1954)
 Papa, maman, ma femme et moi (1955)
 L'impossible Monsieur Pipelet (1955)
 Crime and Punishment (1956)
 Ramuntcho (1959)
  Monsieur (1964)

References

External links
 

1893 births
1964 deaths
French stage actresses
French film actresses
French silent film actresses
People from Angers
20th-century French actresses
Deaths from cancer in France